Pat Doyle may refer to:

Pat Doyle (baseball) (born 1944), baseball coach
Pat Doyle (golfer) (1889–1971), Irish golfer